Hotspot is the fourteenth studio album by English synth-pop duo Pet Shop Boys, released on 24 January 2020 by the band's own label x2, through Kobalt Label Services. It is supported by the singles "Dreamland" featuring Years & Years, which was released on 25 October 2019, and "Burning the Heather", which was released alongside the album announcement on 13 December 2019. The duo planned to tour the UK and Europe in support of the album in mid-2020. The album charted in numerous countries, reaching No. 3 on the album charts in the United Kingdom, Germany and Spain.

Background and recording
The album was primarily recorded at Hansa Studios in Berlin where the duo have written "most of [their] music over the last ten years", with the exception of "Burning the Heather", which was recorded at RAK Studios in London, where Bernard Butler contributed guitar to the track. The duo's website dubbed it the last of a trilogy of albums produced by Stuart Price, beginning with Electric in 2013. All tracks were written by Tennant and Lowe.

Critical reception

Hotspot was met with generally positive reviews. At Metacritic, which assigns a normalised rating out of 100 to reviews from mainstream critics, the album has an average score of 75 out of 100, based on 18 reviews.

In his Substack-published "Consumer Guide" column, Robert Christgau highlighted "I Don't Wanna", "Wedding in Berlin", and "Will-o-the-Wisp", and wrote in summary of the album: "'Happy people/Living in a sad world,' they celebrate their good fortune by setting it to music both stirring and contained – music that never conceals its limitations".

Track listing

Personnel
Pet Shop Boys – performers, programming

Additional musicians
Years & Years – featured artist ("Dreamland")
Stuart Price – bass guitar, additional programming
Bernard Butler – guitar ("Burning the Heather")
Keely Hawkes – additional vocals ("Monkey Business")

Technical
Stuart Price – production, mixing
Pete Gleadall – additional engineering
Nanni Johansson – engineer (Hansa)
Max Wittig – assistant engineer (Hansa)
Frida Claeson Johansson – assistant engineer (Hansa)
Andrew Keller – assistant engineer (Record Plant)
Isabel Gracefield – engineer (RAK)
Dan Ewins – assistant engineer (RAK)
Tim Young – mastering
Farrow – design, art direction
Pet Shop Boys – design, art direction, photography

Charts

References

2020 albums
Albums produced by Stuart Price
Pet Shop Boys albums